Enrique Ortiz may refer to:
 Enrique Ortiz (Spanish footballer) (born 1977), Spanish footballer

See also:
 Enrique Ortez (born 1931), Honduran politician
 Quique Ortiz (born 1979), Argentine footballer